Vesla Mae Weaver (born 1979) is an American political scientist and author. She is a Bloomberg Distinguished Professor of political science and sociology at Johns Hopkins University.

Early life and education 
Weaver was born in 1979. She earned her Bachelor of Arts degree from the University of Virginia before enrolling in Harvard University for her PhD.

Career and research 
Weaver is a Bloomberg Distinguished Professor of political science and sociology at Johns Hopkins Zanvyl Krieger School of Arts and Sciences. She researches racial inequality in the United States, discrimination based on skin color, economic polarization, and race in the United States criminal justice system.

Selected works

Books

Selected articles 

 2017 with J Soss, Police are our government: Politics, political science, and the policing of race–class subjugated communities, in: Annual Review of Political Science. Vol. 20; 565-591.
 2014 with AE Lerman, Staying out of sight? Concentrated policing and local political action, in: The ANNALS of the American Academy of Political and Social Science. Vol. 652, nº 1; 202-219.
 2010 with AE Lerman, Political consequences of the carceral state, in: American Political Science Review. 817-833.
 2007 with JL Hochschild, The skin color paradox and the American racial order, in: Social Forces. Vol. 86, nº 2; 643-670.
 2007, Frontlash: Race and the development of punitive crime policy, in: Studies in American Political Development. Vol. 21, nº 2; 230-265.

References

External links
 
 

Living people
Place of birth missing (living people)
American women political scientists
American political scientists
21st-century American women scientists
Harvard Kennedy School alumni
Johns Hopkins University faculty
21st-century American women writers
21st-century American non-fiction writers
American women non-fiction writers
1979 births
American women academics